On Returning (1977–1979) is a compilation album by English rock band Wire. It was released in 1989 and comprises recordings of the band from 1977 to 1979 (the albums Pink Flag, Chairs Missing and 154, which are also each represented graphically on the album cover), and is seen as the band's first "best of" album, complemented four years later by 1985–1990: The A List which is the "best of" of the band's second era. The album is named after the band's track "On Returning" which closes the album, originally released on the band's third album 154 (1979).

CD track listing

LP track listing

Personnel 

 Wire

 Bruce Gilbert – guitar
 Robert Gotobed – drums
 Graham Lewis – bass guitar, vocals
 Colin Newman – guitar, vocals

 Production

 Bruce Gilbert – design
 Jon Savage – compilation producer, liner notes
 Mike Thorne – producer

References

External links 

 

Wire (band) compilation albums
1989 compilation albums
Restless Records compilation albums
Albums produced by Mike Thorne